Leopoldo Sumaylo Tumulak (29 September 1944 – 17 June 2017) was a Filipino Bishop of the Military Ordinariate of the Philippines. He served as head of the Military Ordinariate of the Philippines from 2005 until his death in 2017.

Early life and education
Tumalak was born in Santander, Cebu. He went to Mainit Primary School and Santander Elementary School for his primary and elementary education. He studied at High School in St. Mary's Academy. He went on to study Philosophy in Seminario Menor de San Carlos and Theology in Seminario Major due San Carlos in Cebu. He gained an MA in Educational Administration in Colegio due San Jose Recoletos.

Priesthood and Auxiliary Bishop
He was ordained as priest on 30 March 1971. Pope John Paul II appointed him as Auxiliary Bishop of Cebu in 1987.

Bishop of Tagbilaran
Bishop Tumulak was appointed as Bishop of Tagbilaran on 28 November 1992.

Military Ordinariate of the Philippines
Pope Benedict XVI appointed him as Military Ordinariate of the Philippines on 15 January 2005.

Death
Tumulak died on 17 June 2017 at the Cardinal Santos Medical Center in San Juan, Philippines from pancreatic cancer, aged 72.

Gallery

References

External links

1944 births
2017 deaths
21st-century Roman Catholic bishops in the Philippines
People from Cebu
University of San Carlos alumni
University of San Jose–Recoletos alumni
Deaths from pancreatic cancer
Deaths from cancer in the Philippines
20th-century Roman Catholic bishops in the Philippines